Brynamman West railway station served the village of Brynamman, in the historical county of Glamorganshire, Wales, from 1865 to 1964 on the Llanelly Railway.

History 
The station was opened as Brynamman on 20 March 1865 by the Llanelly Railway. To the north was a signal box. A new platform was built in 1868 but it was only used by the Llanelly Railway. Its name was changed to Brynamman West in 1950. The station closed to passengers on 18 August 1958 and closed to goods on 28 September 1964.

References 

Disused railway stations in Carmarthenshire
Railway stations in Great Britain opened in 1865
Railway stations in Great Britain closed in 1958
1868 establishments in Wales
1964 disestablishments in Wales